Thomas Clark Trimble III (August 27, 1878 – July 6, 1965) was a United States district judge of the United States District Court for the Eastern District of Arkansas.

Education and career

Born in Lonoke, Arkansas, Trimble received a Bachelor of Laws in 1902 from the University of Arkansas School of Law at Fayetteville. He was in private practice in Lonoke from 1902 to 1937.

Federal judicial service

On June 17, 1937, Trimble was nominated by President Franklin D. Roosevelt to a seat on the United States District Court for the Eastern District of Arkansas vacated by Judge John Ellis Martineau. Trimble was confirmed by the United States Senate, and received his commission on June 18, 1937. He served as Chief Judge from 1948 to 1957 and assumed senior status on January 14, 1957. Trimble served in that capacity until his death on July 6, 1965, in Little Rock, Arkansas.

Family

Trimble married Elsie Jane Walls. The couple had a daughter, Elsijane Trimble Roy, who was appointed in 1977 by President Jimmy Carter to a joint seat on the United States District Court for the Eastern District of Arkansas and the United States District Court for the Western District of Arkansas.

References

Sources
 

1878 births
1965 deaths
Judges of the United States District Court for the Eastern District of Arkansas
United States district court judges appointed by Franklin D. Roosevelt
20th-century American judges
Lawyers from Little Rock, Arkansas
People from Lonoke, Arkansas
University of Arkansas School of Law alumni
Wikipedia articles incorporating text from the Biographical Directory of Federal Judges